The Soviet Union (USSR) competed in the Olympic Games for the first time at the 1952 Summer Olympics in Helsinki, Finland. 295 competitors, 255 men and 40 women, took part in 141 events in 18 sports.

Medalists
The USSR finished second in the final medal rankings, with 22 gold and 71 total medals.

Gold
Nina Bocharova — Artistic gymnastics, women's balance beam
Victor Chukarin — Artistic gymnastics, men's individual all-round
Maria Gorokhovskaya — Artistic gymnastics, women's individual all-round
Victor Chukarin — Artistic gymnastics, men's pommel horse
Hrant Shahinyan — Artistic gymnastics, men's rings
Victor Chukarin, Hrant Shahinyan, Valentin Muratov, Yevgeni Korolkov, Vladimir Belyakov, Iosif Berdiev, Mikhail Perelman, Dmytro Leonkin — Artistic gymnastics, men's team competition
Maria Gorokhovskaya, Nina Bocharova, Galina Minaicheva, Galina Urbanovich, Pelageya Danilova, Galina Shamrai, Ekaterina Kalinchuk — Artistic gymnastics, women's team competition
Victor Chukarin — Artistic gymnastics, men's vault
Ekaterina Kalinchuk — Artistic gymnastics, women's vault
Nina Romashkova — Athletics, women's discus throw
Galina Zybina — Athletics, women's shot put
Yuriy Tyukalov — Rowing, men's single sculls
Anatoli Bogdanov — Shooting, men's 300 m free rifle 3 positions
Ivan Udodov — Weightlifting, men's bantamweight
Rafael Chimishkyan — Weightlifting, men's featherweight
Trofim Lomakin — Weightlifting, men's light-heavyweight
Arsen Mekokishvili — Wrestling, men's freestyle heavyweight
David Tsimakuridze — Wrestling, men's freestyle middleweight
Johannes Kotkas — Wrestling, men's Greco-Roman superheavyweight
Boris Maksovich Gurevich — Wrestling, men's Greco-Roman flyweight
Yakov Punkin — Wrestling, men's Greco-Roman featherweight
Shazam Safin — Wrestling, men's Greco-Roman lightweight

Silver
Maria Gorokhovskaya — Artistic gymnastics, women's balance beam
Maria Gorokhovskaya — Artistic gymnastics, women's floor exercise
Grant Shaginyan — Artistic gymnastics, men's individual all-round
Nina Bocharova — Artistic gymnastics, women's individual all-round
Victor Chukarin — Artistic gymnastics, men's parallel bars
Hrant Shahinyan — Artistic gymnastics, men's pommel horse
Yevgeni Korolkov — Artistic gymnastics, men's pommel horse
Victor Chukarin — Artistic gymnastics, men's rings
Maria Gorokhovskaya, Nina Bocharova, Galina Minaicheva, Galina Urbanovich, Pelageya Danilova, Galina Shamrai, Medeya Dzhugeli, Ekaterina Kalinchuk — Artistic gymnastics, women's team, portable apparatus
Maria Gorokhovskaya — Artistic gymnastics, women's uneven bars
Maria Gorokhovskaya — Artistic gymnastics, women's vault
Vladimir Kazantsev — Athletics, men's 3000 m steeplechase
Yuriy Lituyev — Athletics, men's 400 m hurdles
Boris Tokarev, Levan Kalyayev, Levan Sanadze, Vladimir Sukharev — Athletics, men's 4 × 100 m relay
Maria Golubnichaya — Athletics, women's 80 m hurdles
Elizaveta Bagryantseva — Athletics, women's discus throw
Aleksandra Chudina — Athletics, women's javelin throw
Aleksandra Chudina — Athletics, women's long jump
Leonid Shcherbakov — Athletics, men's triple jump
Stepas Brutautas, Nodar Dzhordzhikiya, Anatoly Konev, Otar Korkiya, Heino Kruus, Ilmar Kullam, Justinas Lagunavičius, Joann Lõssov, Aleksandr Moiseyev, Yuri Ozerov, Kazys Petkevičius, Stasys Stonkus, Maigonis Valdmanis, Viktor Vlasov — Basketball, men's team
Viktor Mednov — Boxing, men's light-welterweight
Sergei Scherbakov — Boxing, men's welterweight
Heorhiy Zhylin, Igor Emchuk — Rowing, men's double sculls
Vladimir Rodimushkin, Aleksey Komarov, Igor Borisov, Slava Amiragov, Leonid Gissen, Yevgeni Samsonov, Vladimir Kryukov, Igor Polyakov, Yevgeny Brago — Rowing, men's eight with coxswain
Boris Andreyev — Shooting, men's 50 m rifle prone
Nikolai Saksonov — Weightlifting, men's featherweight
Yevgeni Lopatin — Weightlifting, men's lightweight
Grigori Novak — Weightlifting, men's middle-heavyweight
Rashid Mamedbekov — Wrestling, men's freestyle bantamweight
Shalva Chikhladze — Wrestling, men's Greco-Roman light-heavyweight

Bronze
Dmitri Leonkin — Artistic gymnastics, men's rings
Galina Minaicheva — Artistic gymnastics, women's vault
Aleksandr Anufriyev — Athletics, men's 10000 m
Bruno Junk — Athletics, men's 10000 m walk
Nadezhda Khnykina-Dvalishvili — Athletics, women's 200 m
Nina Dumbadze — Athletics, women's discus throw
Aleksandra Chudina — Athletics, women's high jump
Yelena Gorchakova — Athletics, women's javelin throw
Klavdia Tochonova — Athletics, women's shot put
Anatoli Bulakov — Boxing, men's flyweight
Gennadi Garbuzov — Boxing, men's bantamweight
Boris Tishin — Boxing, men's light-middleweight
Anatoli Perov — Boxing, men's light-heavyweight
Nina Savina — Canoeing, women's K1 500 m
Lev Vainshtein — Shooting, men's 300 m free rifle 3 positions
Boris Andreyev — Shooting, men's 50 m rifle 3 positions
Arkadi Vorobyov — Weightlifting, men's light-heavyweight
Artem Teryan — Wrestling, men's Greco-Roman bantamweight
Nikolay Belov — Wrestling, men's Greco-Roman middleweight

Athletics

Men
Track & road events

Field events

Combined events – Decathlon

Women
Track & road events

Field events

Basketball

Men's team competition
Main round (Group B)
 Defeated Bulgaria (74–46)
 Defeated Finland (47–35)
 Defeated Mexico (71–62) 
Final round (Group B)
 Lost to United States (58–86)
 Defeated Brazil (54–49) 
 Defeated Chile (78–60)
Semifinals
 Defeated Uruguay (61–57)
Final
 Lost to United States (25–36) →  silver medal
Team roster
Stepas Brutautas
Nodar Dzhordzhikiya
Anatoly Konev
Otar Korkiya
Heino Kruus
Ilmar Kullam
Justinas Lagunavičius
Joann Lõssov
Aleksandr Moiseyev
Yuri Ozerov
Kazys Petkevičius
Stasys Stonkus
Maigonis Valdmanis
Viktor Vlasov

Boxing

Canoeing

Cycling

Road competition
men's individual road race (190.4 km)
Yevgeny Klevtsov — 5:23:34.0 (→ 40th place)
Anatoly Kolesov — did not finish (→ no ranking)
Nikolay Bobarenko — did not finish (→ no ranking)
Vladimir Kryuchkov — did not finish (→ no ranking)

Track competition
Men's 1000 m time trial
Lev Tsipursky
 Final — 1:15.2 (→ 13th place)

Men's 1000 m sprint scratch race
Otar Dadunashvili — 13th place

Diving

Men's 3 m springboard
Roman Brener
 Final — 165.63 points (→ 5th place)

Aleksey Zhigalov
 Final — 151.31 points (→ 8th place)

Gennady Udalov
 Preliminary round — 65.99 points (→ 13th place)

Men's 10 m platform
Aleksandr Bakatin
 Preliminary round — 71.86 points (→ 7th place)
 Final —  126.86 points (→ 7th place)

Roman Brener
 Preliminary round — 71.86 points (→ 8th place)
 Final — 126.31 (→ 8th place)

Mikhail Chachba
 Preliminary round — 65.02 pts (→ 17th place)

Women's 3 m springboard
Ninel Krutova
 Preliminary round — 56.18 points (→ 3rd place)
 Final — 116.86 points (→ 4th place)

Lyubov Zhigalova
 Preliminary round — 54.18 points (→ 7th place)
 Final — 113.83 points (→ 6th place)

Valentina Chumicheva
 Preliminary round — 52.15 points (→ 10th place)

Women's 10 m platform
Tatyana Vereina
 Preliminary round — 43.26 points
 Final — 61.09 points (→ 6th place)

Ninel Krutova
 Preliminary round — 40.67 points
 Final — 57.50 points (→ 8th place)

Yevgeniya Bogdanovskaya
 Preliminary round — 32.35 points (→ 14th place)

Equestrian

Dressage

Eventing

Jumping

Fencing

16 fencers, 13 men and 3 women, represented the Soviet Union in 1952.

Men

Women

Football

 Preliminary round

 1/8 finals

Team roster
Leonid Ivanov
Konstantin Krizhevsky
Anatoli Bashashkin
Avtandil Chkuaseli
Yury Nyrkov
Anatoly Ilyin
Fridrikh Maryutin
Igor Netto
Valentin Nikolayev
Vasily Trofimov
Vsevolod Bobrov
Aleksandr Tenyagin
Avtandil Gogoberidze
Konstantin Beskov
Aleksandr Petrov
Agustín Gómez

Gymnastics

Men
Individual

Team

Women
Individual

Team

Modern pentathlon

Three male pentathletes represented the Soviet Union in 1952.

Rowing

The Soviet Union had 26 male rowers participate in all seven rowing events in 1952.

Men's single sculls
Yuriy Tyukalov — 8:12.8 →  gold medal

Men's double sculls
Heorhiy Zhylin, Ihor Yemchuk  — 7:38.3 →  silver medal

Men's coxless pair
Mikhail Plaksin, Vasily Bagretsov  —   2 h1 repêchage (→ did not advance)

Men's coxed pair
Yevgeny Morozov, Viktor Shevchenko, Mikhail Prudnikov  —   3 h1 r4/5 (→ did not advance)

Men's coxless four
Roman Zakharov, Yury Rogozov, Ivan Makarov, Vladimir Kirsanov  —   2 h1 r4/5 (→ did not advance)

Men's coxed four
Kirill Putyrsky, Yevgeny Tretnikov, Georgy Gushchenko, Boris Fyodorov, Boris Brechko   —   2 h1 r4/5 (→ did not advance)

Men's eight
Yevgeny Brago, Vladimir Rodimushkin, Aleksey Komarov, Igor Borisov, Slava Amiragov, Leonid Gissen, Yevgeny Samsonov, Vladimir Kryukov,  Igor Polyakov   —  6:31.2 →  silver medal

Sailing

Shooting

Men

Swimming

Water polo

Men's team competition
 Qualifying round
 Lost to Netherlands (2–3)
 Defeated India (12–0)
 Preliminary round (Group B)
 Lost to Hungary (3–5)
 Defeated Egypt (3–2)
 Defeated Germany (6–2)
 Semi-final round (Group B)
 Drew with Yugoslavia (3–3)
 Lost to Netherlands (2–4)
 Classification round (5–8)
 Defeated Spain (4–2)
 Drew with Belgium (3–3) → 7th place
 Team roster
Boris Goikhman
Evgeny Semyonov
Yury Teplov
Lev Kokorin
Valentin Prokopov
Aleksandr Liferenko
Pyotr Mshvenieradze
Yury Shlyapin
Vitaly Ushakov
Anatoly Yegorov

Weightlifting

Men

Wrestling

Men's freestyle

Men's Greco-Roman

Medals by republic
In the following table for team events number of team representatives, who received medals are counted, not "one medal for all the team", as usual. Because there were people from different republics in one team.

References

Further reading
 – for medal stats by republic

External links
Official Olympic Reports
International Olympic Committee results database

Nations at the 1952 Summer Olympics
1952
Summer Olympics